Guy Aghaj (also Romanized as Gūy Āghāj; also known as Gū Āghāj and Gūy Āghāch) is a village in Bastamlu Rural District, in the Central District of Khoda Afarin County, East Azerbaijan Province, Iran. At the 2006 census, its population was 48, in 9 families.

References 

Populated places in Khoda Afarin County